The Historic church of Cúcuta or Historic Temple of Cucuta (Spanish: Templo Historico de Cucuta) is a historic site where the first constitution of Colombia was written and signed. It is located in the city of Villa del Rosario in the metropolitan area of Cúcuta, and very close to the Venezuelan border. The site was almost entirely destroyed by the earthquake of 1875, and later partially rebuilt. It is part of the National Monuments of Colombia since 1935.

See also
 Congress of Cúcuta
 Francisco de Paula Santander
 Simón Bolivar

References

Cúcuta
Buildings and structures in Norte de Santander Department
Francisco de Paula Santander
Independence of Colombia
Tourist attractions in Norte de Santander Department
Destroyed churches
Roman Catholic churches in Colombia